Japan participated and hosted the 1994 Asian Games held in Hiroshima, Japan from October 2, 1994 to October 16, 1994.
This country was ranked 2nd with 64 gold medals, 75 silver medals and 79 bronze medals with a total of 218 medals
to secure its second spot in the medal tally.

References

Nations at the 1994 Asian Games
1994
Asian Games